BIDN is a GABA receptor antagonist and convulsant.

See also
Cloflubicyne
TBPS
EBOB
IPTBO

References

Convulsants
Norbornanes
Cyclopentanes
Nitriles
Organofluorides
Trifluoromethyl compounds
GABAA receptor negative allosteric modulators